Svanberg may refer to:

 Bo Svanberg ice-hockey player, born 1967
 Carl-Henric Svanberg businessman, chairman of Volvo
 Eiður Svanberg Guðnason Icelandic politician and diplomat
 John Svanberg, Swedish runner, born 1881
 Jöns Svanberg clergyman and natural scientist
 Katarina Svanberg Swedish physician and oncologist
 Kurt Svanberg Swedish ice-hockey player, born 1913
 Lars Fredrik Svanberg chemist and mineralogist
 Lord Ahriman, Micke Svanberg, Swedish musician and composer
 Mattias Svanberg, Swedish footballer
 Max Walter Svanberg Surrealist painter, illustrator and designer
 Ola Svanberg Swedish ice-hockey player, born 1985
 Olavi Svanberg Finnish ski-orienteering competitor
 Roger Svanberg Swedish curler
 Sven-Erik Svanberg former Swedish airline chief-executive

 8871 Svanberg, a minor asteroid named after